is a town located in Aso District, Kumamoto Prefecture, Japan.

As of October 2016, the town has an estimated population of 3,977 and a density of 34 persons per km². The total area is 115.86 km².

Geography

Climate
Minamioguni has a humid subtropical climate (Köppen climate classification Cfa) with hot, humid summers and cool winters. There is significant precipitation throughout the year, especially during June and July.

Demographics
Per Japanese census data, the population of Minamioguni in 2020 is 3,750 people. Minamioguni has been conducting censuses since 1920.

References

External links

Minamioguni official website 
kurokawa onsen 

Towns in Kumamoto Prefecture